BME may refer to:

Medicine
 Biomedical engineering
 Bone marrow examination

Music
Bachelor of Music Education
 BME Recordings, a record label founded by Lil Jon
 Bad Meets Evil, a hip hop duo from Detroit consisting of rappers Royce da 5'9" and Eminem

Organic chemistry
 Methyl tert-butyl ether, an organic solvent
 2-Mercaptoethanol, an antioxidant also known as β-mercaptoethanol

Transport
 Beaver, Meade and Englewood Railroad, a railroad in Oklahoma, US, which became a subsidiary of the Missouri–Kansas–Texas Railroad.
 Bergisch-Markisch Railway Company (Bergisch-Märkische Eisenbahn-Gesellschaft), in 19th-century Germany
 Broome railway station, National Rail code BME
 Broome International Airport, IATA code BME

Other
 Best Moonsault Ever, the name of a signature move used by pro-wrestler Christopher Daniels
 BMEzine, an online magazine devoted to body modification
 Black and Minority Ethnic, a term commonly used in the UK to describe people of non-white descent
 Bolsas y Mercados Españoles, owner of Bolsa de Madrid and other Spanish exchanges
 British Methodist Episcopal Church, Protestant church in Canada
 Budapest University of Technology and Economics (Budapesti Műszaki és Gazdaságtudományi Egyetem)